Up Here may refer to:

Up Here (magazine), a Canadian magazine first published in 1984
Up Here (TV series), an upcoming Hulu television series
Up Here (album), a 2009 album by Soulive 
Up Here in the Clouds, an 2010 album by Cindytalk 
Up Here Festival, a Canadian art and music festival founded in 2012